The VATT Institute for Economic Research, previously the Government Institute for Economic Research, is a government agency in Finland. VATT is an acronym from VAltion (Government) Taloudellinen (Economic) Tutkimuskeskus (Research Institute). The research institute operates under the administrative domain of the Ministry of Finance.

Location
VATT is located in the Economicum building in the centre of Helsinki, on Arkadiankatu. It shares the building with three academic economics departments, namely the Department of Economics of the University of Helsinki, the Aalto University School of Business and the Department of Economics of Hanken School of Economics. Economicum is also home to the Helsinki Center of Economic Research (HECER).

Research 
VATT produces scientific research and analyses. In particular, researchers at VATT utilize microeconomic research methods and extensive register data to forecast and evaluate the impact of various policy changes on e.g. the behaviour of individuals, households or firms.

Publications 
Researchers at VATT regularly in international scientific publications. They also produce international and domestic working papers, discussion papers, reports and investigations. Most VATT publications can be accessed through the Doria publication archive managed by the National Library of Finland. VATT working papers can also be found from the Research Papers in Economics database. Scientific articles authored by VATT researchers are published regularly in international scientific publications.

Budget
In 2016, VATT's annual budget was EUR 5.5 million, of which two-thirds came from the state budget and one-third from tendered research funding.

Staff
At the end of 2016, the research institute had a staff of 50 people, 40 of whom were researchers.

Directors General 
She was appointed to a five-year term of office on 1 September 2015. Huhtala already tool over as the interim director general in Spring 2015 as her predecessor Juhana Vartiainen was elected to the Parliament of Finland in the spring of 2015.

Vartiainen was appointed VATT's Director General in 2012, when Aki Kangasharju, who was Director General from 2011, left to become the Head of Research and Chief Economist at Nordea Markets.[6] Kangasharju's predecessor was Seija Ilmakunnas, who held the post from 2006 and left VATT in 2011 to become the Director of the Labour Institute for Economic Research.

 
  2006–2011
  2011–2012
 Juhana Vartiainen 2012–2015
  2015–

VATT's Advisory Board 2016–2018 
The Advisory Board supports and challenges the Director General in VATT's strategic development.

 Professor , Aalto University and KU Leuven
 Director General , Statistics Finland
 Senior Financial Adviser Tuulia Hakola-Uusitalo, Ministry of Finance (Finland)
 Head of Unit, Analysis and Prognosis Laura Hartman, Försäkringskassan
 , Varma
 Professor Panu Poutvaara, University of Munich

Chairpersons of the Executive Board 

  1991–1993
 Sixten Korkman 1993–1995
  1995–2002, last Chairperson (because the Finnish State discontinued most Boards of Governors in 2002)

Economic Policy Council 

References

External links
 (English)

Economic research institutes
Ministry of Finance (Finland)
Research institutes in Finland